Óscar Francisco Upegui Pereira (born 29 September 1969) is a Colombian football manager and former player who played as a defender.

References

External links

1969 births
Living people
Sportspeople from Santander Department
Colombian footballers
Association football defenders
Atlético Bucaramanga footballers
Independiente Santa Fe footballers
Deportivo Pasto footballers
Colombian football managers
Categoría Primera A managers
Alianza Petrolera F.C. managers
Atlético Bucaramanga managers
Jaguares de Córdoba managers
Chorrillo F.C. managers
Colombian expatriate football managers
Colombian expatriate sportspeople in Panama
Expatriate football managers in Panama